Stony Island station (also known as Stony Island Avenue station) is the first electrified commuter rail station along the South Chicago Branch of the Metra Electric Line.

Along with Bryn Mawr station, Stony Island is one of two stations that run along the median of 71st Street. South Shore station is located just southeast of that end of that median. No parking lots are available for this station; however there are bus connections provided by the Chicago Transit Authority.

The station is mentioned in Robert A. Heinlein's 1942 novella The Unpleasant Profession of Jonathan Hoag.

Bus connections
CTA
  28 Stony Island 
  71 71st/South Shore

References

External links

Stoney Island Avenue entrance from Google Maps Street View
Dante Avenue entrance from Google Maps Street View

Stony Island